The Bularung Sar is a 7,134 m (according to other sources 7,110 m) high mountain, in the Karakoram mountains range in between shimshal valley of Hunza valley and Nagar Valley, Gilgit-Baltistan, northern Pakistan. 

The Bularung Sar is located in a mountain range of Hispar Muztagh between the western Trivor and the eastern Distaghil Sar. On the northern flank of the flows Momhilgletscher. On the southern slope runs Kunyanggletscher. The first ascent took place in July 1990 by a Swiss expedition on the south ridge. were members of the expedition: Alain Vaucher, Heinz Hügli, Lothar Matter, Carole Milz, Thierry Bionda, Christian Meillard, Gérard Vouga, Vincent von Kaenel, Jean-Jacques Sauvain and Jacques Aymon.

References

Mountains of Gilgit-Baltistan
Seven-thousanders of the Karakoram